Newburyport High School (NHS) is a public high school serving students in ninth through twelfth grades in Newburyport, Massachusetts, United States and is part of the Newburyport Public School System. It was established in 1831 and is one of the oldest public schools in the United States of America.

History
In 1868, the Latin and English High School (1831), later called the Brown High School (1851); the Putnam Free School (1838); and the Female High School (1843) merged to form the Consolidated High and Putnam School. In 1889, the name changed to Newburyport High School.

The current site of Newburyport High School was purchased from Alice Atkinson in 1935, and the deed was recorded at the Southern Essex County Registry of Deeds as Book 3030, Page 279 in March 1935.

Extracurricular activities

Athletics
Newburyport High School competes in the Cape Ann League in several interscholastic sports.

Fall sports
 Cross Country
 Field Hockey
 Football
 Golf
 Soccer
 Volleyball
Winter sports
 Ice Hockey
 Indoor Track
 Ski Racing
 Basketball
Spring sports
Baseball 
Lacrosse  
Softball 
Tennis 
Track & Field

Notable alumni

 Kate Bolick, author
 Harry Curtis, former MLB player (New York Giants)
 Georgia Dabritz, former artistic gymnast, Utah Red Rocks team member.
 Angelo Dagres, former MLB player (Baltimore Orioles)
 Joe Keery, actor
 John Phillips Marquand, Pulitzer Prize winning author
 Chet Nourse, former MLB player (Boston Red Sox)

References

External links
High School website
School District website

Cape Ann League
Buildings and structures in Newburyport, Massachusetts
Schools in Essex County, Massachusetts
Public high schools in Massachusetts